Marvin V. Keller (September 19, 1906 – October 19, 1976) was an American politician from Pennsylvania who served as a Republican member of the Pennsylvania Senate for the 10th district from 1959 to 1970.  He also served in the Pennsylvania House of Representatives for the Bucks County district from 1948 to 1957.

Early life and education
Keller was born in Langhorne, Pennsylvania to Walter H. and Bertha V. Keller.  He was educated in the public schools and graduated from Rider College.

Business career
He was a building contractor.  He also worked as a director of the Newtown Title & Trust Company and as a director for the Langhorne Federal Saving and Loan Association.

Political career
In 1943, he was elected Register of Wills.  He served in the Pennsylvania House of Representatives for the Bucks County district from 1948 to 1957 and the Pennsylvania Senate for the 10th district from 1959 to 1970.

He died after a long illness in 1976 and is interred at the Newtown Cemetery in Newtown, Pennsylvania.

References

1906 births
1976 deaths
20th-century American politicians
Burials in Pennsylvania
Republican Party members of the Pennsylvania House of Representatives
Republican Party Pennsylvania state senators
People from Langhorne, Pennsylvania
Rider University alumni